Oleh Myroslavovych Syrotyuk (born 18 February 1978, Ternopil, Ukraine) is a Ukrainian activist and later politician, member of the Verkhovna Rada.

In 1999-2012 he was activist of various patriotic youth organizations.

In 2012-2014 Syrotyuk was a member of the Verkhovna Rada representing Svoboda.

In 2014 Syrotyuk served as a Governor of Ternopil Oblast.

References

External links
 Profile at the Official Ukraine Today portal

1978 births
Living people
Politicians from Ternopil
Ternopil National Economic University alumni
Taras Shevchenko National University of Kyiv alumni
Governors of Ternopil Oblast
Seventh convocation members of the Verkhovna Rada
Svoboda (political party) politicians